Mister International Azerbaijan (Mister International Azerbaycan) is a national male beauty pageant in Azerbaijan. The grand winner will represent the country at the Mister International pageant. This pageant unrelated to Miss Azerbaijan or Mister Azerbaijan.

Pageant
The Mister International Azerbaijan has been independent pageant since 2014. It is in under Zamir Hüseynov management in Baku, Azerbaijan. The winner expected to be role model of Azerbaijan and become an ambassador for Azerbaijan in Mister International. Azerbaijan has been existed since 2010 but the Mister Azerbaijan titleholder was selected by close casting.

Titleholders

References

External links
 Official website

Azerbaijan
Azerbaijan
Recurring events established in 2014
Azerbaijani awards